Grenada competed at the 2020 Summer Paralympics in Tokyo, Japan, from 24 August to 5 September 2021. This was the country's debut appearance at the Paralympics.

Athletics

Field

Swimming 
DNA: Did not advance

See also
 Grenada at the 2020 Summer Olympics

References

Nations at the 2020 Summer Paralympics
2021 in Grenadian sport